Ornäs is a locality situated in Borlänge Municipality, Dalarna County, Sweden with 1,068 inhabitants in 2010.

History
In November of 1520, Gustav Vasa was hiding in the Ornässtugan when he was chased by the Danish military.
Ornäs has a population around a thousand people. Stora Ornäs was also built in Ornäs.  
Barbro Stigsdotter also lived in Ornäs after marrying a Swedish noble.

Trivia
The Ornäs birch also comes from Ornäs and is the national tree of Sweden.

See also
Ornäs Birch

References 

Populated places in Dalarna County
Populated places in Borlänge Municipality